New London is an unincorporated community, and former incorporated town, in Monroe Township, Howard County, Indiana, United States. It is part of the Kokomo, Indiana Metropolitan Statistical Area.

History
New London was laid out and platted in 1845. It was incorporated as a town in 1848. In the 1870 census in had 240 people in the town. Although by the next census New London was unincorporated and Greentown had replaced it as the counties third incorporated place.

Geography

New London has an unusually large, and beautiful cemetery for its size. The cemetery is nearly half the size of the town.
New London also has a folk tale of an underground passageway somewhere within the town and was also said used for the actual underground railroad movement in the fight for emancipation in America.

References

Unincorporated communities in Howard County, Indiana
Kokomo, Indiana metropolitan area
Former municipalities in Indiana